The Ripple River is a small river of north-central Minnesota. The stream headwaters are at the outlet of Bay Lake of eastern Crow Wing County and it flows east and north to its confluence with the Mississippi River on the north side of Aitkin in Aitkin County.

See also
List of rivers of Minnesota

References

External links
Minnesota Watersheds
USGS Hydrologic Unit Map - State of Minnesota (1974)

Rivers of Minnesota
Tributaries of the Mississippi River
Rivers of Crow Wing County, Minnesota
Rivers of Aitkin County, Minnesota